Brookneal Historic District is a national historic district located at Brookneal, Campbell County, Virginia. It encompasses 105 contributing buildings and 2 contributing structures in the central business district and surrounding residential areas of Brookneal. Most buildings date to the period spanning from 1875 to 1925.  Notable buildings include the Lewis Andrew Pick Birthplace, Callaway-Smith House, Henderson Funeral Home, Staunton River Lodge #155 AF&AM, Brookneal Drug Store (1912), N.I. Walthall & Son Department Store, Myers Department Store, Hotel Brookneal (1919), Bank of Brookneal (1913) by McLaughlin Pettit & Johnson, and Brookneal Community Building (1938).

It was listed on the National Register of Historic Places in 2011.

References

Historic districts in Campbell County, Virginia
National Register of Historic Places in Campbell County, Virginia
Historic districts on the National Register of Historic Places in Virginia